Santiago 'Santi' Jara Collado (born 2 February 1991) is a Spanish footballer who plays as a right winger for Real Murcia.

Club career
Born in Almansa, Castile-La Mancha, Jara began his career with hometown's UD Almansa. In June 2011 he joined Sporting de Gijón, being assigned to the reserves in the Segunda División B.

Jara made his debut with the Asturians' first team on 27 November 2012, in a 2–0 away loss against CA Osasuna in the round of 32 of the Copa del Rey. On 2 February of the following year he appeared in his first Segunda División game, playing the full 90 minutes in a 1–2 home defeat to Racing de Santander.

On 15 March 2013, Jara renewed his contract with Sporting until 2016. He scored his first goal for the main squad one day later, contributing to a 5–2 home win over FC Barcelona B.

On 22 July 2015, after starting in only one match during the season, Jara cut ties with the Rojiblancos, and joined Albacete Balompié two days later. He subsequently resumed his career in the third tier, representing Racing de Santander, Real Murcia, FC Cartagena and UCAM Murcia CF, aside of a one-year spell at Georgia's FC Saburtalo Tbilisi.

References

External links

1991 births
Living people
People from Almansa
Sportspeople from the Province of Albacete
Spanish footballers
Footballers from Castilla–La Mancha
Association football wingers
Segunda División players
Segunda División B players
Tercera División players
UD Almansa players
Sporting de Gijón B players
Sporting de Gijón players
Albacete Balompié players
Racing de Santander players
Real Murcia players
FC Cartagena footballers
UCAM Murcia CF players
Erovnuli Liga players
FC Saburtalo Tbilisi players
Spanish expatriate footballers
Expatriate footballers in Georgia (country)
Spanish expatriate sportspeople in Georgia (country)